Waliszewski  (with its female form Waliszewska  and plural form Waliszewscy ) is a Polish surname  of toponymic origin, deriving either from Waliszewice, two small villages with the name Waliszew or a third, now defunct Waliszew which later separated into Waliszew Dworski and Stary Waliszew, small settlements in the Łódź and Masovian voivodeships. The stem of the toponym Waliszew is derived from the diminutive form Walisz of the old Polish male name Walisław/Wolisław (from Polish wola "will" and sława "glory"). 

Notable people with the surname Waliszewski include:

Kazimierz Waliszewski (1849–1935), Polish author of history
Zygmunt Waliszewski (1897–1936), Polish painter

References

Polish-language surnames